Sar Saleh Kutah (also Romanized as Sar Şāleḩ Kūtāh; also known as Saleh Kootah and Şāleḩ Kūtāh) is a village in Miankuh-e Moguyi Rural District, in the Central District of Kuhrang County, Chaharmahal and Bakhtiari Province, Iran. At the 2006 census, its population was 458, in 88 families. The village is populated by Lurs.

References 

Populated places in Kuhrang County
Luri settlements in Chaharmahal and Bakhtiari Province